MS  Mikhail Kalinin was an ocean liner owned by the Soviet Union's Baltic State Shipping Company. She was built in 1958 by VEB Mathias-Thesen Werft, Wismar, East Germany. The Mikhail Kalinin, named after the nominal head of state of Russia and later of the Soviet Union Mikhail Kalinin, was scrapped in 1994 in Alang, India.

See also
 List of cruise ships

References

External links

Михаил Калинин 

Cruise ships
Ships built in East Germany
Passenger ships of the Soviet Union
East Germany–Soviet Union relations
1957 ships
Ships built in Wismar